These are the official results of the athletics competition at the 2005 Jeux de la Francophonie which took place on 11–16 December 2005 in Niamey, Niger.

Men's results

100 meters

Heats – December 11Wind:Heat 1: -0.3 m/s, Heat 2: +0.3 m/s, Heat 3: 0.0 m/s, Heat 4: 0.0 m/s, Heat 5: 0.0 m/s

Semi-finals – December 11Wind:Heat 1: +1.1 m/s, Heat 2: +0.5 m/s, Heat 3: +0.4 m/s

Final – December 12Wind: +0.4 m/s

200 meters

Heats – December 11Wind:Heat 1: 0.0 m/s, Heat 2: 0.0 m/s, Heat 3: +0.6 m/s

Final – December 12Wind:+1.0 m/s

400 meters

Heats – December 12

Final – December 13

800 meters

Heats – December 11

Final – December 13

1500 meters
December 16

5000 meters
December 14

10,000 meters
December 11

Marathon
December 16

110 meters hurdles

Heats – December 11Wind:Heat 1: 0.0 m/s, Heat 2: 0.0 m/s

Final – December 12Wind:+1.7 m/s

400 meters hurdles

Heats – December 13

Final – December 14

3000 meters steeplechase
December 13

4 x 100 meters relay
December 13

4 x 400 meters relay
December 16

20 kilometers walk
December 12

High jump
December 16

Pole vault
December 13

Long jump
December 12

Triple jump
December 14

Shot put
December 11

Discus throw
December 12

Hammer throw
December 11

Javelin throw
December 16

Decathlon

Women's results

100 meters

Heats – December 11Wind:Heat 1: +0.8 m/s, Heat 2: +1.7 m/s, Heat 3: +0.7 m/s

Final – December 12Wind:+0.3 m/s

200 meters

Heats – December 11Wind:Heat 1: +2.4 m/s, Heat 2: 0.0 m/s, Heat 3: +0.5 m/s

Final – December 12Wind:+0.7 m/s

400 meters

Heats – December 11

Final – December 12

800 meters

Heats – December 14

Final – December 16

1500 meters
December 13

5000 meters
December 16

10,000 meters
December 12

Marathon
December 16

100 meters hurdles

Heats – December 14Wind:Heat 1: 0.0 m/s, Heat 2: 0.0 m/s

Final – December 16Wind:+1.1 m/s

400 meters hurdles
December 13

4 x 100 meters relay
December 13

4 x 400 meters relay
December 16

High jump
December 12

Pole vault
December 12

Long jump
December 16

Triple jump
December 11

Shot put
December 16

Discus throw
December 14

Hammer throw
December 13

Javelin throw
December 11

References
Results
5emes Jeux de la Francophonie – Résultats complets Athletisme (archived) . 2005 Niamey. Retrieved on 2010-08-01.
2005 Francophonie Games Results. Athlé. Retrieved on 2010-08-01.

Jeux de la Francophonie
2005